The 2000 Ericsson Open was the 16th edition of this tennis tournament and was played on outdoor hard courts. The tournament was part of the ATP Masters Series of the 2000 ATP Tour and was classified as a Tier I event on the 2000 WTA Tour. Both the men's and the women's events took place at the Tennis Center at Crandon Park in Key Biscayne, Florida, United States, from March 23 through April 6, 2000.

Finals

Men's singles

 Pete Sampras defeated  Gustavo Kuerten 6–1, 6–7(2–7), 7–6(7–5), 7–6(10–8)
It was Pete Sampras's first title of the year and his 62nd overall. It was his first Masters title of the year and his eleventh overall. It was his third title at this event, also winning in 1993 and 1994.

Women's singles

 Martina Hingis defeated  Lindsay Davenport 6–3, 6–2
It was Martina Hingis's second title of the year and her 28th overall. It was her second Tier I title of the year and her eleventh overall. It was her second title at this event, also winning in 1997.

Men's doubles

 Todd Woodbridge /  Mark Woodforde defeated  Martin Damm /  Dominik Hrbatý 6–3, 6–4

Women's doubles

 Julie Halard-Decugis /  Ai Sugiyama defeated  Nicole Arendt /  Manon Bollegraf 4–6, 7–5, 6–4

External links
Official website
Men's Singles Draw
Men's Doubles Draw
Women's Singles, Doubles and Qualifying Draws

 
Ericsson Open
Ericsson Open
Miami Open (tennis)
Ericsson Open
Ericsson Open
Ericsson Open
Ericsson Open